The Panasonic Village Jazz Festival is/was a summer annual music festival held at Washington Square Park in Greenwich Village in New York City. It began in 1994 and continued until at least 1999.

References

Jazz festivals in New York City